Eddie Fisher Sings is a 1952 album by Eddie Fisher. It was issued as a 10-inch long-playing record by RCA Victor Records.

Track listing

 
In 2002, the album, with I'm in the Mood for Love and Christmas With Eddie Fisher, was issued on a compact disc.

References 

1952 albums
RCA Victor albums
Eddie Fisher (singer) albums